Jondo Muzashvili (born 23 October 1970) is a Georgian judoka.

Achievements

References

External links

1970 births
Living people
Male judoka from Georgia (country)